The Salt Lake City Stars are an American professional basketball team in the NBA G League based in West Valley City, Utah, and are affiliated with the Utah Jazz. The Stars play their home games at the Maverik Center. Prior to the move to Salt Lake City for the 2016–17 season, the team was known as the Idaho Stampede.

History

Idaho Stampede
The team was founded as a member of the Continental Basketball Association in 1997 and was league runner-up in the 2003–04 season, losing to the Dakota Wizards. After the 2005–06 season, the Stampede announced that the team would be joining the NBA Development League. From 2005 to 2015, the team played as the Idaho Stampede at the CenturyLink Arena in Boise. Before then, they played home games at the Ford Idaho Center in Nampa. The Stampede's sole NBA affiliate is the Utah Jazz, with whom they originally had a hybrid partnership. However, on March 24, 2015, the Utah Jazz and the Idaho Stampede announced that the Jazz had purchased the Stampede, becoming the 8th NBA team to become owners of their D-League affiliate.  They also had past affiliations with the Denver Nuggets, Seattle SuperSonics, Toronto Raptors and most recently the Portland Trail Blazers, with the Jazz taking sole affiliation after the 2013–2014 season.

Move to Salt Lake City
The team was purchased by the Jazz on March 24, 2015, and signed a one-year lease at CenturyLink Arena. Shortly after the Jazz bought the Stampede, rumors abounded about the team's relocation to Orem, Utah to be closer to the parent club; coincidentally, Orem was home to the D-League's Utah Flash from 2007 until 2011 (the team now plays in Wilmington, Delaware as the Delaware Blue Coats).  These rumors were not far off, as on April 4, 2016, the Utah Jazz and the D-League announced that the Stampede would relocate to Salt Lake City for the 2016–17 season and would be renamed the Salt Lake City Stars. The Stars would play at the Bruin Arena at Salt Lake Community College in Taylorsville, Utah for five seasons.

On October 10, 2022, it was announced that the team will be moving into the Maverik Center as their home arena beginning with the 2022-2023 season.

Season-by-season

Current roster

Notable players

 Alaa Abdelnaby – F/C; formerly of the Portland Trail Blazers, Milwaukee Bucks, Boston Celtics, Philadelphia 76ers, and Sacramento Kings as well as Papagou BC (Greece), the Omaha Racers (CBA), and Olympique Antibes (France) (now color analyst for CBS Sports Network)
 Lance Allred – PF; currently playing overseas; played in the NBA for the Cleveland Cavaliers
 Rafer Alston – PG; retired; previously played for the Milwaukee Bucks, Toronto Raptors, Miami Heat, Orlando Magic, and New Jersey Nets
 Roberto Bergersen - former Boise State basketball player; helped lead the Idaho Stampede to their first NBA Development League championship
 Allen Crabbe – G/F; previously played for the Portland Trail Blazers, Brooklyn Nets, Atlanta Hawks, and Minnesota Timberwolves
 Sundiata Gaines – PG; currently plays overseas
 Richard Howell - PF/C in the Israeli Basketball Premier League
 Nathan Jawai – C; currently plays overseas; formerly with the Minnesota Timberwolves and Toronto Raptors
 Tyus Jones - PG; currently plays for the Memphis Grizzlies; formerly with the Minnesota Timberwolves
 Coby Karl - SG formerly of the Los Angeles Lakers, Cleveland Cavaliers, and Golden State Warriors; former Boise State basketball player; son of NBA head coach George Karl; formerly head coach for the South Bay Lakers of the NBA G League
Michale Kyser (born 1991) - basketball player for Hapoel Holon in the Israeli Basketball Premier League
 Randy Livingston – PG; former head coach for the team
 Scott Machado (born 1990) - basketball player in the Israeli Basketball Premier League
 Josh McRoberts - PF; formerly with the Portland Trail Blazers, Indiana Pacers, Los Angeles Lakers, Orlando Magic, Charlotte Bobcats, Miami Heat, and Dallas Mavericks
 CJ McCollum – SG with the New Orleans Pelicans, formerly with the Portland Trail Blazers
 C. J. Miles - SF; formerly with the Utah Jazz, Cleveland Cavaliers, Indiana Pacers, Toronto Raptors, Memphis Grizzlies, and Washington Wizards
 Patrick Mills – PG; currently with the Brooklyn Nets; formerly with the Portland Trail Blazers and San Antonio Spurs
 Mike Taylor – PG/SG; currently plays overseas 
 Antoine Walker – PF; formerly of the Boston Celtics, Dallas Mavericks, Atlanta Hawks, Miami Heat, and Minnesota Timberwolves; Retired
 Spud Webb - PG; formerly of the Atlanta Hawks, Sacramento Kings, Minnesota Timberwolves, and Orlando Magic

Awards and honors

NBA assignments

NBA affiliates

Idaho Stampede
 Denver Nuggets (2009–2012)
 Portland Trail Blazers (2007–2014)
 Seattle SuperSonics (2006–2008)
 Toronto Raptors (2008–2009)
 Utah Jazz (2006–2007, 2011–2012, 2014–2016)

Salt Lake City Stars
Utah Jazz (2016–present)

References

External links

 
Basketball teams established in 2016
Basketball teams in Utah
2016 establishments in Utah
Taylorsville, Utah
West Valley City, Utah
Sports in Salt Lake City